Fayzur Rahman ) is a Bangladesh Awami League politician and the former Member of Parliament from Brahmanbaria-5.

Early life
Rahman was born on 5 November 1966. He has studied up to SSC or grade ten.

Career
In 1992 Rahman joined Epic Design, a buying house, as an assistant merchandiser. In 1995 he joined the merchandising department of the Winners Limited, a buying house, as a manager. He was appointed the managing director of Tusuka garments. He was elected to parliament from Brahmanbaria-5 in 2014 as a candidate of Awami League. He is the Chairman of Novoair.

Rahman term as member of Parliament ended on 30 December 2018.

References

Awami League politicians
Living people
10th Jatiya Sangsad members
Year of birth missing (living people)